The Innovative Satellite Technology Demonstration Program is a series of spacecraft missions for testing technology and ideas put forward by universities and private companies. The program demonstrates various experimental devices and technology in space by providing flight opportunities. It is managed by the JAXA Research and Development Directorate. According to JAXA, the goal of this program is to test high risk, innovative technology that will lead to the space industry gaining competitiveness in the international field.

Innovative Satellite Technology Demonstration-1
Innovative Satellite Technology Demonstration-1 is the first mission in the Innovative Satellite Technology Demonstration Program. The mission included several spacecraft, the largest being RAPIS-1, along with six smaller satellites. The call for proposals was announced in 2015, and selection results were announced in February 2016. A total of 14 projects were selected; however a proposal by IHI Corporation, the "Demonstration experiment of a innovative ship information receiving system" was later dropped, making the number of projects reaching space 13. Seven projects will be tested on board the satellite RAPIS-1, either as parts or components. Three projects are flying as microsatellites, and three more as CubeSats.

Innovative Satellite Technology Demonstration-1 was successfully launched on 18 January 2019. Payloads flown on the mission were tested in space for a year, and the operational data gained were given to the developers.The Innovative Satellite Technology Demonstration-1 marked the first multi-satellite launch by Epsilon launch vehicle.

RAPIS-1

RAPIS-1 (RAPid Innovative payload demonstration Satellite-1) is a satellite within Innovative Satellite Technology Demonstration-1 that demonstrated selected projects as either parts or components. Of the 13 projects, 7 were demonstrated on board RAPIS-1.

Payload on RAPIS-1
 The NanoBridge based Field Programmable Gate Array (NBFPGA) was developed by NEC Corporation
 High data rate X-band Transmitter (HXTX) / X-band Middle Gain Antenna (XMGA) was developed by Keio University
 The Green Propellant Reaction Control System (GPRCS) was developed by Japan Space Systems
 The Space Particle Monitor (SPM) was developed by Japan Space Systems
 The Deep Learning Attitude Sensor (DLAS) was developed by Tokyo Institute of Technology
 The Thin Membrane Solar Array Paddle (TMSAP) was developed by JAXA
 Fireant (Miniature Spaceborne GNSS Receiver) was developed by Chubu University

MicroDragon
MicroDragon is a microsatellite proposal submitted by VNSC (Vietnam National Satellite Center).

RISESAT
Rapid International Scientific Experiment Satellite, or RISESAT is a microsatellite developed by Tohoku University. It is equipped with scientific instruments that were selected on an international scale. The project RISESAT was selected for the Innovative Satellite Technology Demonstration Program to demonstrate highly precise attitude control and high resolution multispectral observation technology. RISESAT's high resolution multispectral camera will be capable of measuring the growth rate and health of crops from space. RISESAT's remote sensing instrument, High Precision Telescope (HPT) utilizes a liquid crystal tunable filter. The project was previously called Hodoyoshi 2.

ALE-1
ALE-1, also known as ALEe, is a microsatellite for demonstrating the creation of artificial shooting stars. Built and operated by ALE Co., Ltd., it is the company's first satellite.

OrigamiSat-1
OrigamiSat-1 (COSPAR 2019-003B, SATCAT 43933) was a 3U CubeSat developed by Tokyo Institute of Technology to demonstrate the deployment of large structures from a small, folded state. The satellite decayed from orbit on 30 April 2022.

Aoba VELOX-IV
Aoba VELOX-IV is a 2U CubeSat equipped with a low-light camera. It was jointly developed by Kyushu Institute of Technology in Japan and Nanyang Technological University (NTU) of Singapore. The pulsed plasma thrusters developed by NTU gives the CubeSat maneuvering capabilities, a necessity for a future lunar mission, as the Moon's irregular gravity field requires orbiters to perform orbit maintenance to extend its mission lifetime. It has a design lifetime of 12 months in low Earth orbit.

NEXUS
NEXUS, short for NExt generation X Unique Satellite is a 1U CubeSat developed by Nihon University. An amateur radio satellite, it is equipped with a transmitter with half the power consumption and a data transmission rate per second 32 times larger than a traditional amateur radio transmitter. NEXUS will demonstrate packet radio in space.

Innovative Satellite Technology Demonstration-2
The call for proposals for Innovative Satellite Technology Demonstration-2, the second mission of the program, was announced in July 2018, and selection results were announced in December of the same year. There are nine satellites launching on this mission: the RAISE-2 smallsat, four microsatellites and four CubeSats. The microsatellites HIBARI, Z-Sat and DRUMS are primarily for engineering tests. TeikyoSat-4, which was additionally selected in 2020, will conduct life science studies. The four CubeSats are ASTERISC, ARICA, NanoDragon and KOSEN-1.

Innovative Satellite Technology Demonstration-3
Proposals for the third mission were selected in May 2020. It is planned to be launched in October 2022.

Innovative Satellite Technology Demonstration-4
The call for proposals for Innovative Satellite Technology Demonstration-4 was released by JAXA on 17 June 2022, and as of September 2022 three CubeSats have been selected.

See also
 MDS-1
 Proba Missions
 Space Test Program

References

External links
 Official website 
 Innovative Satellite Technology Demonstration-1 - JAXA
 Special website of launch 
 MicroDragon Satellite Project
 ORIGAMI PROJECT
 ALE
 AOBA VELOX-IV
 NEXUS

Technology demonstration satellites
JAXA